A paean is a song or expression of thanksgiving, triumph, healing or praise.

Paean, Paeeon, Paeëon, Paeon, Paian, Paieon, or Paion (from the Ancient Greek Παιάν, Παιήων, or Παιών) may refer to:

Greek mythology
 Paean (god), the physician of the Greek gods
 Paeon (father of Agastrophus), the father of Agastrophus in Homer's Iliad, and the husband of Cleomede and father of Laophoon in Quintus Smyrnaeus' Posthomerica
 Paeon (son of Antilochus), a lord of Messenia, from whom the Attic clan and deme of Paeonidae or Paionidai is supposed to have derived its name  
 Paeon (son of Endymion),  from whom the district of Paionia was believed to have derived its name
 Paeon (son of Poseidon), the son of Helle and Poseidon; in some legends he was called Edonus.
 Paeon, son of Ares and father of Biston.
 Paean, an epithet for the Greek god Apollo
 Paean, an epithet for the Greek healer-god Asclepius

Places
 Paion, a municipal unit in Achaea, Greece 
 Paion (Thrace), the ancient Greek city located in Thrace

People
 Paeon of Amathus, an early Hellenistic historian from Amathus on the island of Cyprus

Other uses
 Paean (horse), a British-trained racehorse
 Paeon (prosody), a metrical foot containing four syllables, where one of the syllables is long and the other three are short
 Paeon diagyios, another name for the metrical foot cretic or amphimacer, containing three syllables: long, short, long
 "A Paean", the original name for "Lenore", a poem by Edgar Allan Poe

See also
 Paeon (myth)